Philippeville may refer to:

 Philippeville, a city and municipality in Belgium
 Philippeville, Algeria, old name of the city of Skikda in Algeria